Andrea Conti (born March 27, 1974) is a former Italian professional basketball player. He last played for Vanoli Cremona.

From November, 2013 he is the General Manager of Vanoli Cremona.

References

External links
Eurobasket Profile
Legabasket Profile

Vanoli Cremona

1974 births
Living people
Italian men's basketball players
Pallacanestro Biella players
Pallacanestro Varese players
Forwards (basketball)